Futurity Stakes are a type of horse race and may specifically refer to:

Futurity Stakes (MRC), a horse race held at Caulfield Racecourse in Australia by the Melbourne Racing Club
Coronation Futurity Stakes, Woodbine Racetrack in Toronto, Ontario, Canada
Futurity Stakes (Ireland), a horse race held at the Curragh in Ireland
Belmont Futurity Stakes, a horse race held at Belmont Park in the United States by New York Racing Association
Los Alamitos Futurity, a horse race held at Los Alamitos Racetrack in the United States
Breeders' Futurity Stakes, a horse race held at Keeneland Race Course in the United States
Futurity Stakes, a former name of the Vertem Futurity Trophy, a horse race at Doncaster Racecourse in Great Britain

See also
Del Mar Futurity, Del Mar Racetrack in Del Mar, California